Joel Christian Gill (born 15 January 1975 in Roanoke, Virginia) is an American cartoonist, educator, and author of a number of graphic novels from Fulcrum Publishing: Strange Fruit Vol I : Uncelebrated Narratives from Black History, Bass Reeves: Tales of the Talented Tenth No.1, and Bessie Stringfield: Tales of the Talented Tenth, No. 2,  Strange Fruit Vol II: More Uncelebrated Narratives from Black History, a picture book "Fast Enough: Bessie Stringfield's First Ride" from Lion Forge and Fights: One Boys Triumph Over Violence  a memoir about how children deal with trauma and abuse from Oni Press. He has taught studio art, Illustration and comics while serving as Chair of the Comic Arts and Foundations programs at the New Hampshire Institute of Art. In the Fall of 2019 he accepted an appointment as Associate Professor of Illustration at Massachusetts College of Art and Design. In 2020 he began work on an adaptation of  Dr. Ibram X Kendi's Stamped from the Beginning a Definitive History of Racist Ideas in America for Ten Speed Press.

Early life
Gill earned a Bachelor of Arts (BA) in Art from Roanoke College and a Master of Fine Arts (MFA) in Painting from Boston University in 2004.

Career
Owing to the success of his ongoing series of graphic novels highlighting little known and uncelebrated historical African-Americans and the contributions they made to American history, Gill is frequently profiled in print and interviewed on television and radio. He is also asked to speak at comic arts conventions and college campuses across the U.S. and in 2016 was honored with a Distinguished Alumni Award from Boston University.

He has also contributed to the Huffington Post  advocating for the end to Black History Month and for the incorporation of the achievements of African-Americans into the larger narrative of American history. Gill is also a member of the Boston Comics Roundtable.

References

Artists from New Hampshire
American graphic novelists
African-American comics creators
Roanoke College alumni
Boston University College of Fine Arts alumni
Living people
1975 births
African-American novelists
21st-century African-American people
20th-century African-American people